Hoseynabad-e Arabkhaneh (also Romanized as Ḩoseynābād-e ‘Arabkhāneh) is a village in Arabkhaneh Rural District, Shusef District, Nehbandan County, South Khorasan Province, Iran. At the 2006 census, its population was 11, in 5 families.

References 

Populated places in Nehbandan County